Kurt Koch (born 9 September 1960) is a Swiss sports shooter. He competed in the men's 50 metre rifle prone event at the 1996 Summer Olympics.

References

External links
 

1960 births
Living people
Swiss male sport shooters
Olympic shooters of Switzerland
Shooters at the 1996 Summer Olympics
Place of birth missing (living people)